Indreskomo or Skomo Indre is a village in the municipality of Brønnøy in Nordland county, Norway. The Skogmo Chapel is located in this village.

References

Brønnøy
Villages in Nordland